US Naval Base Philippines was number of United States Navy bases in the Philippines Islands in the Pacific Ocean. Most were built by the US Navy Seabees, Naval Construction Battalions, during World War II. The US Naval Bases in Philippines were lost to the Empire of Japan in December 1941 during the Philippines campaign of 1941–1942. In February 1945 the United States Armed Forces retook the Philippines in the Battle of Manila in 1945. Before the captured US bases on Luzon were retaken the US Navy Seabees built a new large base, Leyte-Samar Naval Base, on the Philippine Island of Leyte, starting in October 1944.

History
Naval Base Manila was a major United States Navy base south of the City of Manila, on Luzon.  Some of the bases dates back to 1898, the end of the Spanish–American War. Starting in 1938 civilian contractors were used to build new facilities in Manila to prepare for World War II. With the American-British-Dutch-Australian Command (ABDACOM) the Allies tried to limit the advance of Japan. ABDACOM did not have enough troops or supplies to carry out the mission.  Work stopped on December 23, 1941, when Manila was declared not defendable against the Empire of Japan southward advance, which took over the city on January 2, 1942, after the US declared it an Open city. Many US Navy ships and submarines escaped the Philippines and traveled south to ports in Borneo. As Japan advanced south into Borneo these vessels fled further south to form the new US Naval Bases in Australia. US Navy personnel, including doctors and some nurses, that did not get evacuated from the bases became POWs with the Troops in the Battle of Bataan. The nurses became known as the Angels of Bataan for their care of the Troop till liberated in February 1945.

US Navy construction and repair started in March 1945 with the taking of Manila in the costly Battle of Manila ending on March 2, 1945. Naval Base Manila supported the Pacific War and remained a major US Naval Advance Base until its closure in 1971.
To support the taking of Naval Base Manila, Leyte Gulf was taken first and base construction started on October 20, 1944. Leyte-Samar Naval Base was made of base on both the island of Leyte and the islands of Samar. The US Naval bases for supported troops, ships, submarines, PT boats, seaplanes, supply depots, training camps, fleet recreation facilities, and ship repair depots. To keep supplies following the bases were supplied by the vast II United States Merchant Navy. After the war ended on VJ Day, Leyte Gulf bases closed and the Naval Base Manila remained an US Naval Advance Base till in 1971. After the Invasion of Lingayen Gulf on January 9, 1945, the Seabees built up a Naval Base Lingayen at Lingayen city and the surrounding gulf. In 1944 and 1945 Japan started using kamikaze attacks on US Navy ships in the Philippines. With two large Naval Bases on Luzon: Naval Base Manila and Naval Base Subic Bay, Naval Base Lingayen was closed after the war. Naval Base Subic Bay, like Naval Base Manila was base of Spain lost to the United States in the Battle of Manila Bay 1898. Subic Bay was lost to Japan in 1941 and retaken in January 1945. In 1992 the United States turned Naval Base Subic Bay over to the Philippine Navy.

Major Philippines Bases
Naval Base Manila FPO# 3142 
Mariveles Naval Section Base
Naval Base Corregidor
Sternberg General Hospital
Naval Station Sangley Point FPO# 961
Naval Base Cavite  FPO# 954
Naval Base Subic Bay FPO# 3002 
Leyte-Samar Naval Base FPO# 3201 
Tacloban Naval station,  FPO# 3964
Tolosa base   
Jinamoc Seaplane Base
Calicoan Naval Base
Guiuan Naval Base
Tubabao Base
Salcedo PT Boat Base
Guiuan Naval hospital
Manicani Base
Manicani Island Base FPO# 3864 
Naval Base at Hinundayan, Leyte, FPO# 3958 
Naval Base Lingayen, Luzon, FPO# 3960  
Naval Base at  San Fernando, La Union, FPO# 3863

Minor Philippines Bases
Naval Base Puerto Princesa, Palawan, FPO# 3291 
Naval Base Calbayog, Samar, FPO# 3957 
Naval Base at Casiguran Sound, FPO# 1133 
Naval Base at Cotabato, Mindanao, FPO# 1159
Naval Base at San Antonio, Luzon, FPO# 3001 
Naval Base at Masinloc, Luzon, FPO# 3003 
Naval Base at Batangas, Luzon, FPO# 3004 
Naval Base at Balayan, Luzon, FPO# 3006 
Naval Base at Baler Bay, FPO# 3028 
Naval Base at Davao, Mindanao, FPO# 3042 
Naval Base at Zambonanga, FPO# 3070 
Naval Base at San Jose, Mindoro, FPO# 3100 
Naval Base at Bacolod, Negros, FPO# 3101 
Naval Base at Ormoc, Leyte, FPO# 3102 
Naval Base at Laoag, Luzon, FPO# 3106 
Naval Base at Dingalan, Luzon, FPO# 3107 
Naval Base at Aparri, Luzon, FPO# 3132 
Naval Base at Cebu, FPO# 3133,  PT Boat base 
Naval Base at Legaspi, FPO# 3136 
Naval Base at Vigan, FPO# 3138 
Naval Base at Tawi-Tawi Island, FPO# 3144 
Naval Base at Palawan,  FPO# 3146 
Naval Base at Batangas Bay, FPO# 3160 
Naval Base at Mactan Island, FPO# 3858, depot, repair, seaplane base 
Naval Base at Cagayan, Mindanao, FPO# 3955 
Naval Base at Buenavista, Mindanao, FPO# 3956 
Naval Base at Iloilo, Panay, FPO# 3959, PT Boat, depot, repair depot 
Naval Base at Masbate, Masbate, FPO# 3961 
Naval Base at Misamis, Mindanao, FPO#3962 
Naval Base at Sarangani, Mindanao,  FPO# 3963
Naval Base at Basilan Island, Mindanao, PT Boats, Puerto Isbela
Naval Base at Mangarin Bay, Mindoro, PT Boats
Naval Base at Polloc Harbor
Naval Base at Santiago Cove depot, PT boat base
Naval Base at Bacuit, Palawan FPO# 3293
Naval Base at Coron Bay, Palawan FPO# 3292
Naval Base at Panaon Island, PT boat base (Liloan)
Naval Base Bobon Point, Bobon, Samar, PT boat base (Liloan)
Naval Base Malalag Bay   PT boat and small naval base in Davao Gulf
Davao field small base

Gallery

See also

Naval Station San Miguel
Fort Drum (Philippines)
Military history of the Philippines during World War II
Camp Aguinaldo
Camp Crame
Fort San Felipe (Cavite)
Asiatic Squadron
Women of Valor
List of memorials to Bataan Death March victims
US Naval Base Solomons
US Naval Base New Zealand

External links
youtube Cavite Naval Base
youtube Manila Bay, Cavite Naval Base Hit by US Navy 
youtube Sangley Pt Philippines 1960s
youtube  Seabees of World War II

References 

Military installations of the Philippines
Military installations established in 1989
Military facilities in Cavite
Closed installations of the United States Navy